Curtis Sumpter (born January 30, 1984) is an American professional basketball player currently working as an assistant coach for the Delaware 87ers of the NBA G League.

A 6'7" forward from Brooklyn, New York, Sumpter was named to the All-Big East second team, and the first team All-Philadelphia Big Five in the 2004–2005 season. He averaged 15.3 points per game and 7.2 rebounds, helping to lead Villanova to the Sweet 16. After being red-shirted during the 2005-2006 season with a knee injury, Sumpter returned to the Wildcats' lineup for the 2006-2007 season and earned first team All-Big East honors.

On August 14, 2007 Sumpter signed with German team Köln 99ers.

References

External links
Villanova Wildcats bio
ESPN.com Player Card

1984 births
Living people
African-American basketball players
American expatriate basketball people in Belgium
American expatriate basketball people in France
American expatriate basketball people in Germany
American expatriate basketball people in Greece
American men's basketball players
Basketball players at the 2011 Pan American Games
Basketball players from New York City
BCM Gravelines players
Belfius Mons-Hainaut players
Bishop Loughlin Memorial High School alumni
Chorale Roanne Basket players
Greek Basket League players
JA Vichy players
Köln 99ers players
Maroussi B.C. players
Pan American Games bronze medalists for the United States
Pan American Games medalists in basketball
Parade High School All-Americans (boys' basketball)
Small forwards
Sportspeople from Brooklyn
Tulsa 66ers players
Villanova Wildcats men's basketball players
Medalists at the 2011 Pan American Games
21st-century African-American sportspeople
20th-century African-American people